NSSE may refer to:

 Network Security Systems Europe (United Kingdom)
 National Special Security Event (United States)
 National Survey of Student Engagement

See also

 
 NSE (disambiguation)